The Juréia-Itatins Mosaic is a protected area mosaic in the state of São Paulo, Brazil.
It was created in 2006, suspended in 2009 and recreated in 2013. It includes strictly protected and sustainable use conservation units in a coastal area of well-preserved Atlantic Forest.

Location

The Juréia-Itatins Mosaic covers parts of the municipalities of Iguape, Itariri, Miracatu and Peruíbe in the state of São Paulo.
When first created in 2006 it covered .
After being recreated in 2013 it covered .
The Juréia-Itatins area is environmentally important since it holds one of the best preserved remnants of Atlantic Forest.
It includes an extensive fluvial marine plain through which the Una do Prelado River flows, with rich flora and fauna.

History

First version

The Juréia-Itatins Mosaic of conservation units  was created by law 12.406 of 12 December 2006.
It included the Juréia-Itatins Ecological Station and the newly created Itinguçu and Prelado state parks, Despraiado and Barra do Una sustainable development reserves and the Ilhas do Abrigo e Guararitama Wildlife Refuge.
The state parks and sustainable development reserves were carved out of the ecological station, and an area of banana plantations in the municipality of Miracatu, north of the station, was also dropped from the station. However the Iguape swamps were added to the ecological station, which now covered  rather than its former .

On 11 September 2007 the procurer general of the state declared that law 12.406 was unconstitutional.
On 10 June 2009 a judgement upheld the finding of unconstitutionality.
The Juréia-Itatins Mosaic was suspended in 2009.

Second version

Law 14.982 of 8 April 2013 again altered the limits of the Juréia-Itatins Ecological Station, re-categorising some areas.
These were the  Itinguçu State Park, the  Prelado State Park, the  Barra do Una Sustainable Development Reserve and the  Despraiado Sustainable Development Reserve.
The Juréia-Itatins Ecological Station now covered .
The law recreated the Jureia-Itatins Mosaic, this time covering .

The process of preparing management plans for the units in the mosaic restarted in September 2015 with a series of meetings with people of the mosaic.
27 workshops were scheduled, involving all the stakeholders.

Notes

Sources

2006 establishments in Brazil
Protected areas of São Paulo (state)
Protected area mosaics of Brazil